This is a timeline documenting events and facts about English-speaking stand-up comedy in the year 2019.

January

 January 4: Various comedians, Comedians of the World is released on Netflix.
 January 15: Sebastian Maniscalco's special Stay Hungry on Netflix.
 January 26: Amanda Seales' special I Be Knowin'! on HBO.
 January 29: Gabriel Iglesias' special One Show Fits All on Netflix.

February
 February 5: Ray Romano's special Right Here, Around the Corner on Netflix.
 February 14: Ken Jeong's special You Complete Me, Ho on Netflix.

March
 March 12: Bryan Callen's special Complicated Apes on digital platforms.
 March 12: Jimmy Carr's special The Best of Ultimate Gold Greatest Hits on Netflix.
 March 19: Amy Schumer's special Growing on Netflix.
 March 26: Nate Bargatze's special The Tennessee Kid on Netflix.

April

 April 1: Kevin Harts's special Irresponsible on Netflix.
 April 14: Chad Daniels' album Dad Chaniels on Google Play.
 April 22: Sara Pascoe's LadsLadsLads aired on the BBC in the UK. 
 April 30: Anthony Jeselnik's special Fire in the Maternity Ward on Netflix.

May
 May 6: Nick Di Paolo's special A Breath of Fresh Air on YouTube.
 May 10: David Cross' special Oh, Come On released on digital platforms.
 May 15: Isaac Butterfield's special The Butterfield Effect on his website.
 May 21: Wanda Sykes' special Not Normal on Netflix.

June
 June 4: Miranda Sings' special Live … Your Welcome on Netflix.
 June 7: Christian Finnegan's album 60% Joking on digital platforms.
 June 12: Jo Koy's special Comin' In Hot on Netflix.
 June 18: Adam Devine's special Best Time of Our Lives on Netflix.
 June 26: Mike Epps' special Only One Mike on Netflix.

July
 July 1: Katherine Ryan's special Glitter Room on Netflix.
 July 9: Aziz Ansari's special Right Now on Netflix.
 July 13: Ian Edwards' special Bill Burr Presents Iantalk: Ideas Not Worth Spreading on Comedy Central.
 July 30: Whitney Cummings' special Can I Touch It? on Netflix.

August
 August 10: Julio Torres's special My Favorite Shapes on HBO.
 August 16: Jim Gaffigan's special Quality Time on Amazon (company).
 August 20: Simon Amstell's special Set Free on Netflix.
 August 26: Dave Chappelle's special Sticks & Stones on Netflix.

September
 September 10: Bill Burr's special Paper Tiger on Netflix.
 September 24: Jeff Dunham's special Beside Himself on Netflix.
 September 30: Mo Gilligan's special Momentum on Netflix.

October
 October 1: Nikki Glaser's special Bangin'  on Netflix.
 October 8: Deon Cole's special Cole Hearted on Netflix.
 October 22: Jenny Slate's special Stage Fright on Netflix.
 October 29: Arsenio Hall's special Smart & Classy on Netflix.

November
 November 5: Seth Meyers' special Lobby Baby on Netflix.
 November 12: Jeff Garlin's special Our Man in Chicago on Netflix.
 November 19: Iliza Shlesinger's special Unveiled on Netflix.
 November 26: Mike Birbiglia's special The New One on Netflix.
 November 29: Andy Woodhull' special Funniest joke you’ve ever heard about being late on Dry Bar Comedy.

December
 December 3: Tiffany Haddish's special Black Mitzvah on Netflix.
 December 7: Dan Soder's special Son of A Gary on HBO.
 December 10: Michelle Wolf's special Joke Show on Netflix.
 December 17: Ronny Chieng's special Asian Comedian Destroys America on Netflix

See also 
 List of stand-up comedians

References 

Stand-up comedy
Stand-up comedy
2010s in comedy
Stand-up comedy
Culture-related timelines by year